Roko Tošić (born 14 July 1979) is a Croatian table tennis player. He won silver medals at the 2005 Mediterranean Games and the 2009 Mediterranean Games. With Zoran Primorac, he reached the third round of the 2009 World Table Tennis Championships – Men's doubles, but was defeated by the Hong Kong team. He was ranked 68th in the world in April 2002; and 153rd as of April 2013. As of 2017, he was playing for STK Libertas Marinkolor, Dubrovnik.

Competitions 
World Championships:
 2005 World Table Tennis Championships – Men's singles
 2007 World Table Tennis Championships – Men's doubles
 2009 World Table Tennis Championships – Men's singles
 2009 World Table Tennis Championships – Men's doubles
 2011 World Table Tennis Championships – Men's singles
 2011 World Table Tennis Championships – Men's doubles
 2013 World Table Tennis Championships – Men's singles
 2013 World Table Tennis Championships – Men's doubles

Mediterranean Games:
 Table tennis at the 2005 Mediterranean Games – Men's singles, silver medal
 Table tennis at the 2009 Mediterranean Games – Men's Team, silver medal

References

External links
 

Croatian male table tennis players
1979 births
Living people
Mediterranean Games silver medalists for Croatia
Competitors at the 2005 Mediterranean Games
Competitors at the 2009 Mediterranean Games
Mediterranean Games medalists in table tennis
20th-century Croatian people